Tarimela Nagi Reddy (11 February 1917 – 28 July 1976) was a communist politician from Andhra Pradesh, India. He was born in a wealthy family in Anantapur district of Andhra Pradesh. He completed his schooling from the Rishi Valley School India, founded by Andhra philosopher Jiddu Krishnamurti. He would later study at Loyola College in Chennai and at Banaras Hindu University in Varanasi. During his student days, he got involved with nationalism and Marxism. His political activities got him jailed in 1940, 1941 and 1946. He revolted against his father who was a landlord and donated his land of over 1000 acres to landless labourers.

Reddy was elected to the Madras Legislative Assembly as a Communist Party of India candidate in 1951 from Anantaptur. He was elected to the Lok Sabha from Anantapur in 1957. In 1962 he was elected to the Andhra Pradesh legislative assembly as a Communist Party of India candidate from Puttur. In 1967 he was again elected to the assembly, now as a Communist Party of India (Marxist) (CPI(M)) candidate from Anantapur. Neelam Sanjeeva Reddy, a two-time Chief Minister of Andhra Pradesh and the sixth President of India, was Nagi Reddy's brother-in-law.

In 1968, T.N. Reddy broke with the CPI(M) and formed the Andhra Pradesh Coordination Committee of Communist Revolutionaries (APCCCR). He succeeded in attracting a large part of the CPI(M) cadre to APCCCR. During a brief period APCCCR was part of All India Coordination Committee of Communist Revolutionaries (AICCCR). Reddy was however very critical of the left adventurist line of Charu Majumdar. Instead, he wanted to promote a mass line. Thus, Reddy and the APCCCR were expelled from the AICCCR.

In 1975, Unity Centre of Communist Revolutionaries of India (Marxist-Leninist) was formed through the merger of the APCCCR with three other smaller groups. T.N. Reddy worked as a leader of APCCCR until his death in 1976. His most famous work is India Mortgaged.

Siblings:
Tarimala Ranga Reddy, MLA and Samithi President
Tarimala Krishna Reddy, Samithi President
Tarimala Ramadoss Reddy, Communist leader.

See also
G. Raghava Reddy

External links
tarimela.com
Legacy and History of Indian Maoism - A Tribute to Tarimala Nagi Reddy and the Telangana Armed Struggle
Important Persons
Tarimela Nagi Reddy Remembered
India Mortgaged

India MPs 1957–1962
Telugu politicians
Members of the Andhra Pradesh Legislative Assembly
Naxalite–Maoist insurgency
Lok Sabha members from Andhra Pradesh
People from Anantapur district
People from Rayalaseema
Leaders of the Opposition in the Andhra Pradesh Legislative Assembly
Communist Party of India (Marxist–Leninist) Liberation politicians
Communist Party of India (Marxist) politicians from Andhra Pradesh
1917 births
1976 deaths
Communist Party of India politicians from Andhra Pradesh